Portugal was represented by the song "Silêncio e tanta gente", written and performed by Maria Guinot, at the 1984 Eurovision Song Contest, which took place on 5 May in Luxembourg City. The song was chosen through a national final organised by broadcaster RTP.

Before Eurovision

Festival da Canção 1984 
The final was held on 7 March 1984 at the Auditório Europa in Lisbon, hosted by Fialho Gouveia and Manuela Moura Guedes. The winner was chosen by an "expert" jury in two rounds of voting - the first to select the top 6 songs and the second to select the winner. 

Doce represented Portugal in ESC 1982. Two members of the group - Teresa Miguel and Fatima Padinha - also represented Portugal in ESC 1978 with the group Gemini. Paulo de Carvalho and Fernando Tordo were both with in the group 'Os Amigos' as represented Portugal in ESC 1977. Paulo also represented Portugal in 1974 and Fernando Tordo did the same in 1973.

At Eurovision 
Guinot was the nineteenth and last performer on the night of the contest, following Italy. At the close of voting, "Silêncio e tanta gente" had received 38 points, placing Portugal 11th of the 19. The Portuguese jury awarded its 12 points to Spain.

Voting

References 

1984
Countries in the Eurovision Song Contest 1984
Eurovision